Joel Fred Sherzer (March 18, 1942 – November 6, 2022) was an American anthropological linguist known for his research with the Guna people of Panama and his focus on verbal art and discourse-centered approaches to linguistic research. He co-founded the Archive of the Indigenous Languages of Latin America. Sherzer completed his Ph.D. at the University of Pennsylvania in 1968 and thereafter taught at the University of Texas at Austin for his entire career.

Awards 

 1978 Guggenheim Fellowship
 2018 Society for the Study of the Indigenous Languages of the Americas Archiving Award

The Archive of the Indigenous Languages of Latin America 
Over the course of his research career, Sherzer observed that scholars were creating substantial collections of recordings and texts in indigenous Latin American languages, and he was concerned about the preservation of these priceless collections of indigenous verbal art. In 2001, Sherzer, along with Anthony Woodbury and Mark McFarland, founded the Archive of the Indigenous Languages of Latin America to collect, digitize, and permanently preserve these resources and make them freely available over the internet.

Works 

 Adoring the saints: Fiestas in  Central Mexico. Yolanda Lastra, Dina Sherzer, and Joel Sherzer. Austin: University of Texas Press. 2009
 Stories, myths, chants, and songs of the Kuna Indians. Compiled, edited and translated by Joel Sherzer. Austin: University of Texas Press. 2004
 Speech play and verbal art. Austin: University of Texas Press. 2002.
 Translating Native American Verbal Art: Ethnopoetics and Ethnography of Speaking. Edited by Kay Sammons and Joel Sherzer. Washington, D.C.: Smithsonian Institution Press. 2000.
 Verbal art in San Blas: Kuna culture through its discourse.  Cambridge: Cambridge University Press. 1990
 Las culturas nativas Latino Americanas a través de su discurso. Editors Ellen Basso and Joel Sherzer. Quito: Ediciones Abya-Yala. 1990.
 Native American Discourse: Poetics and Rhetoric. Joel Sherzer and Anthony C. Woodbury. Cambridge: Cambridge University Press. 1987.
 Native South American discourse. Editors Joel Sherzer and Greg Urban. Berlin: Mouton de Gruyter. 1986.
 Kuna ways of speaking: An ethnographic perspective.  Austin: University of Texas Press. 1983.
 The origin and diversification of language. Edited posthumously by Joel Sherzer Chicago: Aldine-Atherton. 1971.

References

External links
 Kuna Collection of Joel Sherzer Collection of audio recordings and documents from Sherzer's research with the Guna.
 Kuna Photograph Collection of Joel Sherzer Collection of photographs taken by Sherzer during his research with the Guna. Also includes audio of interviews of Sherzer discussing the content of the photographs.
 Fieldwork stories about Joel Sherzer Video recordings [in Spanish and Guna] of Guna people speaking of Sherzer's work.

1942 births
2022 deaths
Linguists from the United States
University of Pennsylvania alumni
University of Texas at Austin faculty